The Motupiko River is a river of the Tasman Region of New Zealand's South Island. A major tributary of the Motueka River, it flows north from its origins southeast of the Hope Saddle, meeting the Motueka at Kohatu Junction, 15 kilometres west of Wakefield. The Motupiko's tributaries include the Rainy River.

See also
List of rivers of New Zealand

References

Rivers of the Tasman District
Rivers of New Zealand